Domingo Lejona (born 2 February 1938) is an Argentine former footballer. Lejona played club football for Gimnasia y Esgrima (La Plata), Vélez Sársfield and Chacarita Juniors. He was also part of Argentina's squad for the 1960 Summer Olympics, but he did not play in any matches.

References

External links

1938 births
Living people
Association football midfielders
Argentine footballers
Club de Gimnasia y Esgrima La Plata footballers
Club Atlético Vélez Sarsfield footballers
Chacarita Juniors footballers
Pan American Games medalists in football
Pan American Games gold medalists for Argentina
Footballers at the 1959 Pan American Games
Medalists at the 1959 Pan American Games
People from Chascomús
Sportspeople from Buenos Aires Province